Wiesław Jerzy Podobas (born 20 May 1936) is a retired Polish cyclist. He competed at the 1960 Summer Olympics in the 100 km team time trial and finished in 10th place. Individually, he took part in the road race, but failed to finish. He won the Tour de Pologne in 1959.

Podobas graduated from a technical school with a degree of car mechanic, and later also competed as a driver. He is married to Barbara. They live in Warsaw and have three sons, Tadeusz, Piotr and Grzegorz.

References

External links

1936 births
Living people
Cyclists at the 1960 Summer Olympics
Olympic cyclists of Poland
Polish male cyclists
Cyclists from Warsaw